Spacebrock is the 23rd studio album by Hawkwind, released in 2000, although the lack of contributors and title has prompted suggestions that it is a de facto Dave Brock solo album.

Track listing
"Life Form" (Brock) - 1:42 - previously released on PXR5
"Some People Never Die" (Brock) 4:02 - previously released on Church of Hawkwind
"Dreamers" (Brock) - 3:40
"Earth Breath" (Brock) - 1:36
"You Burn Me Up" (Brock) - 4:34
"The Right Way" (Brock) - 0:53
"Sex Dreams" (Brock, Jameson, Swift, Walker) - 3:48
"To Be or Not" (Brock) - 2:12
"Kauai" (Brock) - 1:35 - previously released on Distant Horizons
"Earth Calling" (Brock) - 3:47
"The Starkness of the Capsule" (Brock) - 3:13
"Behind the Face" (Brock) - 3:15
"Space Brock" (Brock) - 4:47
"Space Pilots" (Brock) - 2:01
"1st Landing" (Brock, Calvert) - 1:46
"The Journey" (Brock) - 2:48 - not related to the track of the same name on Alien 4 
"Do You Want This Body" (Brock) - 6:34

Personnel
Hawkwind
Dave Brock - guitar, bass guitar, keyboards, vocals
Richard Chadwick - drums on "Dreamers", "Earth Calling" and "Space Pilots"
Crum - keyboards on "Dreamers"
Beano Jameson, Robert Swift, Dez Walker - synthesizers and sequencers on "Sex Dreams"

Release history
Oct 2000: Voiceprint, HAWKVP18CD

References

2000 albums
Hawkwind albums
Albums produced by Dave Brock